The 2021–22 season is FC Erzgebirge Aue's 76th season in existence and the club's 6th consecutive season in the 2. Bundesliga, the second tier of German football. The club will also participate in the DFB-Pokal.

Background

Erzgebirge Aue finished the 2020–21 season in 12th place in the 2. Bundesliga on 44 points. Manager Dirk Schuster left the club in May 2021, and was replaced by Aleksey Shpilevsky the following month.

Season summary
Manager Shiplevsky was sacked after 7 matches in September 2021, being replaced by the interim coaching duo of Marc Hensel and Carsten Müller. Sporting director Pavel Dochev took over as head coach in February 2022.

Friendly matches

Competitions

2. Bundesliga

League table

Matches

DFB-Pokal

Transfers

Transfers in

Loans in

Transfers out

Loans out

Notes

References

Erzgebirge Aue
FC Erzgebirge Aue seasons